Feldthurns is a comune (municipality) in South Tyrol in northern Italy about  northeast of Bolzano.

Geography

Feldthurns borders Brixen, Klausen, Villnöß and Vahrn.

Frazioni
The municipality of Feldthurns contains the frazioni (subdivisions, mainly villages and hamlets) Garn (Caerne), Schnauders (Snodres), Schrambach (San Pietro Mezzomonte), Tschiffnon (Giovignano).

History

Coat-of-arms
The emblem is party per fess: in the first part it's represented two embattled towers of gules, the second is checky of gules. It's the canting arms used in 1607 in the castle by the Bishops of Brixen and symbolize the German name of the municipality: towers (Thurn) over the fields (Feld). The emblem was granted in 1966.

Notable residents
Isotopic analysis of Ötzi the Iceman's tooth enamel suggests that he may have spent his childhood in present-day Feldthurns, circa 3275BCE.

Society

Linguistic distribution
According to the 2011 census, 98.33% of the population speak German, 0.91% Italian and 0.76% Ladin as first language.

Demographic evolution

References

External links
  Homepage of the municipality

Municipalities of South Tyrol